The dual state is a model in which the functioning of a state is divided into a normative state, which operates according to set rules and regulations, and a prerogative state, "which exercises unlimited arbitrariness and violence unchecked by any legal guarantees". It was invented by Ernst Fraenkel to describe the functioning of the Nazi state especially law in Nazi Germany. Although it was originally intended as an analysis of authoritarian states, some elements of the prerogative state are present in democracies. The model has also been applied to other states such as Israel, the United States, South Africa, Fascist Italy, twenty-first century China and Russia.

References

Further reading

Social theories
Philosophy of law
Political science theories
Theories of law